The Cambodian–Dutch War (Dutch: Cambodjaans-Nederlandse Oorlog; Khmer: សង្គ្រាមកម្ពុជា-ហូឡង់) from 1643–1644 was a conflict sparked by a coup which brought a new Cambodian King to the throne who converted to Islam with the help of Malay traders resident in the country. The new King initiated a massacre of Dutch East India Company employees and subsequently defeated the Dutch forces sent to extract retribution from the Cambodians.

War
In 1642, a Cambodian Prince named Ponhea Chan became King Reameathiptei I after overthrowing and assassinating the previous King. Malay Muslim merchants in Cambodia helped him in his takeover, and he subsequently converted to Islam from Buddhism, changed his name to Ibrahim, and married a Malay woman. He then started a war to drive out the Dutch East India Company, by first starting a massacre in the capital of the Dutch, commandeering two of their ships, and killing 35 Dutch employees of the Company in addition to the Company's ambassador.

On the Mekong River, the Cambodians defeated the Dutch East India Company in a mostly naval war from 1643–1644 with the Cambodian forces suffering 1,000 dead, and the Dutch forces suffering 156 dead out of 432 soldiers and multiple Dutch warships fell into Cambodian hands. The Dutch East India Company ambassador who was killed along with his men was Pierre de Rogemortes, and it was not until two centuries later that European influence in Cambodia could recover from the defeat inflicted on the Dutch. 

This Muslim Cambodian King was ousted and arrested by the Vietnamese Nguyễn lords after Ibrahim's brothers, who remained Buddhists, requested Vietnamese help to restore Buddhism to Cambodia by removing him from the throne. In the 1670s, the Dutch left all the trading posts they had maintained in Cambodia after the massacre in 1643.

See also
 Cambodian–Spanish War
 Sino-Dutch conflicts
 Battle of Liaoluo Bay
 Trịnh–Nguyễn War
 Siege of Fort Zeelandia

References

Sources
 
 
 
 
 
 
 

17th century in Cambodia
Military history of the Dutch East India Company
Geopolitical rivalry
1640s in the Dutch Republic
Islam and violence
Military history of Cambodia
Wars involving the Dutch Republic
Wars involving Cambodia
1643 in Asia
1644 in Asia